Brennan Bernardino (born January 15, 1992) is an American professional baseball pitcher for the Seattle Mariners of Major League Baseball (MLB). He made his MLB debut in 2022.

Amateur career

Bernardino played college baseball for the Cal State Dominguez Hills Toros. During his time there, he was teammates with Philadelphia Phillies pitcher Bubby Rossman.

Professional career

Cincinnati Reds

He was drafted by the Cincinnati Reds in the 26th round of the 2014 Major League Baseball Draft. In his first professional season, he played for the Rookielevel Billings Mustangs and pitched to a 1–1 record and 1.01 earned run average (ERA) in 26 innings pitched. The next season, he split the season between the Dayton Dragons and the Louisville Bats, finishing the season with a combined 2–3 record and a 3.72 ERA in 55 innings pitched. In 2016, he played the entire season on the Daytona Tortugas and recorded a 5–3 record and a 3.71 ERA in 60 innings pitched. He was promoted to the DoubleA Pensacola Blue Wahoos in 2017, and went 2–4 with a 4.46 ERA in 40 innings. In the 2017–18 offseason, he pitched for the Naranjeros de Hermosillo in Mexico, pitching to a 4.26 ERA in 6 innings pitched. He started the 2018 season with Pensacola, but was released from the Reds organization after accumulating a 6.30 ERA in 20 innings pitched.

Winnipeg Goldeyes

On August 8, 2018, Bernardino signed with the Winnipeg Goldeyes. He started five out of the six games he pitched for them, and went 2–3 with a 3.18 ERA in 34 inning pitched.

Toros de Tijuana

After pitching for the Tigres de Aragua in the 2018–19 offseason, he signed with the Toros de Tijuana for the 2019 season.

Cleveland Indians

After pitching to a 2.94 ERA in 33 innings pitched with Tijuana, his contract was purchased by the Cleveland Indians. He pitched for the Lynchburg Hillcats and Akron Rubberducks and recorded a cumulative 1–1 record and a 4.76 ERA in 11 innings pitched. He did not play a minor league game in 2020 as the season was cancelled due to the COVID-19 pandemic.

Toros de Tijuana (second stint)

In 2021 he signed with the Toros de Tijuana for a second stint with the team. He spent the entire season with Tijuana and pitched to a 0–1 record and a 5.63 ERA in 24 innings pitched.

For the 2022 season in 9 starts for Tijuana, he recorded a 3.07 ERA in 44 innings pitched.

Seattle Mariners
On June 25, 2022, Bernardino had his contract purchased by the Seattle Mariners. He was assigned to the TripleA Tacoma Rainiers and pitched to a 2–0 record and a 0.79 ERA in 11 innings pitched. On July 30, 2022, Bernardino's contract was selected to the major league roster. He made in MLB debut the next day, coming on in the tenth inning and taking the loss after Houston Astros designated hitter Yordan Álvarez hit a single to score the unearned runner. He made 2 appearnces for the big league club in 2022, logging a 3.86 ERA with no strikeouts in 2.1 innings pitched.

Bernardino was optioned to Triple-A Tacoma to begin the 2023 season.

References

External links

 Cal State Dominguez Hills Toros bio

1992 births
Living people
Akron RubberDucks players
Baseball players from California
Billings Mustangs players
Cal State Dominguez Hills Toros baseball players
Dayton Dragons players
Daytona Tortugas players
Louisville Bats players
Lynchburg Hillcats players
Major League Baseball pitchers
Naranjeros de Hermosillo players
People from Valencia, Santa Clarita, California
Pensacola Blue Wahoos players
Scottsdale Scorpions players
Seattle Mariners players
Tacoma Rainiers players
Tigres de Aragua players
Toros de Tijuana players
Winnipeg Goldeyes players
2019 WBSC Premier12 players